Robert Alan Baron (born 1943) is Professor of Management and the Spears Chair of Entrepreneurship at Oklahoma State University's Spears School of Business.  He studied psychology at City University of New York and received his Ph.D. from the University of Iowa in 1968. He is co-author of the textbook Social Psychology (13th edition), published by Allyn & Bacon, as well as numerous other books (e.g., Behavior in Organizations, 9th edition) and journal articles. Dr. Baron has held faculty appointments at Rensselaer  Polytechnic Institute, Purdue, the University of Minnesota, Texas, South Carolina, Washington, Princeton University, and Oxford University.

Bibliography
Social Psychology: Understanding Human Interaction (1974)
Human Aggression with Deborah R. Richardson (1994)
Psychology (2003)
Entrepreneurship: An Evidence-based Guide (2012)

References

External links
Baron's Page at Oklahoma State University

21st-century American psychologists
Social psychologists
Living people
Rensselaer Polytechnic Institute faculty
1943 births
Oklahoma State University faculty
City University of New York alumni
20th-century American psychologists